2010 Urawa Red Diamonds season

Competitions

Player statistics

Other pages
 J. League official site

Urawa Red Diamonds
Urawa Red Diamonds seasons